The 1971–72 Marshall Thundering Herd men's basketball team represented Marshall University during the 1971–72 NCAA University Division men's basketball season. The Thundering Herd, led by first-year head coach Carl Tacy, played their home games at the Veterans Memorial Fieldhouse as an Independent. They finished the season 23–4 and received an at-large bid to the NCAA tournament where they lost to Southwestern Louisiana in the First Round. They finished ranked No. 12 in the AP Poll and No. 18 in the UPI Poll.

Roster

Schedule and results

|-
!colspan=8| Regular Season
|-

|-
!colspan=8| NCAA tournament

References

Marshall Thundering Herd men's basketball seasons
Marshall
Marshall
Marshall Thundering Herd basketball (men's)
Marshall Thundering Herd basketball (men's)